Events in the year 1830 in Norway.

Incumbents
Monarch: Charles III John

Events
 Det Dramatiske Selskab in Kristiansund was founded.

Arts and literature

Births
6 February – Lars Hertervig, painter (d.1902)
10 February – Andreas Leigh Aabel, physician and poet (d.1901)
23 September – Jens Theodor Paludan Vogt, engineer (d.1892)
26 September – Olaus Arvesen, educator and politician (d.1917)

Full date unknown
Ole Andreas Bachke, politician and Minister (d.1890)
Olav Jakobsen Høyem, teacher, telegrapher, supervisor of banknote printing and linguist (d.1899)
Hans Møller, politician, consul and businessperson (d.1911)
Hans Georg Jacob Stang, politician and Prime Minister (d.1907)

Deaths
13 January – Christian Magnus Falsen, statesman, jurist, and historian (b.1782)
14 April – Erike Kirstine Kolstad, the first professional native stage actress in Norway (b.1792)
22 April – Lars Johannes Irgens, jurist and politician (b.1775)
29 December – Hans Henrik Rode, military officer (b.1767)

Full date unknown
Hans Hagerup Falbe, politician and Minister (b.1772)

See also